YSL may refer to:

Fashion
 Yves Saint Laurent (brand), by fashion designer Yves Saint Laurent
 Yves Saint Laurent (designer) (1936–2008), French fashion designer

Music
 YSL Records (Young Stoner Life Records), a United States hip hop record label
 "YSL", a song by Lil Uzi Vert from their 2017 album Luv Is Rage 1.5
 "YSL", a song by Ninho from his 2021 album Jefe
 "YSL", a song by Gunna from his 2017 album Drip Season 2
 YSL, a series of saxophones by Yamaha; see List of Yamaha Corporation products

Politics
 Young Socialist League, former British organisation
 Young Socialist League, last incarnation of the youth wing of the historical Communist Party of Australia
 Young Socialist League, later Socialist Youth League (United States)

Other uses
 Saint-Léonard Aerodrome (IATA airport code: YSL), New Brunswick, Canada
 Yankee Stadium Legacy, a baseball card set
 Yarrow Shipbuilders Limited, a former UK firm
 YSL Residences (Yonge Street Living Residences), Toronto, Ontario, Canada; a skyscraper
 Yolŋu Sign Language
 Yugoslav Sign Language (ISO 639 code: ysl)
 YSL, a brand of Japan Tobacco

See also

 Yves Saint Laurent (disambiguation)